Sam Belkin (born 18 April 1988) is a New Zealand amateur wrestler. He competed in the Men's freestyle 97 kg event at the 2014 Commonwealth Games where he won the bronze medal.

References 

1988 births
Living people
Commonwealth Games bronze medallists for New Zealand
Wrestlers at the 2014 Commonwealth Games
New Zealand male sport wrestlers
Commonwealth Games medallists in wrestling
21st-century New Zealand people
Medallists at the 2014 Commonwealth Games